The women's 20 kilometres walk at the 2016 Summer Olympics in Rio de Janeiro, Brazil, was held on 19 August on a route along Pontal.

Summary
The race took off as a pack, with María Guadalupe González on point but nobody exerting any force to take the lead.  Always present near the front were the three Chinese athletes; World champion and world record holder Liu Hong, world silver medalist Lü Xiuzhi and  Qieyang Shenjie.  Towering over the lead group was Anežka Drahotová.  After the first laps, Lu and her teammates increased the pace from 9:17 initial laps to sub-9; walkers began to drop off the back of the pack, one by one.  By the halfway mark, the pack was down to 15.  Within the next kilometer, the pack was down to seven, González, two Italians; Antonella Palmisano and Eleonora Giorgi, Brazilian favorite Érica de Sena, and the two Chinese using the pace; Lu and Liu.  Going to the 13K mark, Giorgi received the red paddle to step off the course.  In the next 500 metres, Qieyang and Ana Cabecinha, who had fallen off the back were able to rejoin the pack.  Qieyang continued past the pack to take the position at the front.  After a brief visit, Cabecinha could not stay with the group.  The pace continued to drop, down to 8:42 for the eighth lap, de Sena the next off the back.  Before the end of the penultimate lap, Palmisano fell off the back, leaving the three Chinese vs González.  But González held the lead, pushing the pace.  Qieyang broke and quickly fell back to get passed by Palmisano.  The lap finished in 8:40, the fastest yet.  Through the last lap, the pace increased  Each already had one red card on the board, Liu getting shown three yellow paddles during the lap, still chasing González a step behind with Lu first a step then dropping off the back with just over 500 metres to the finish.  Down the final straight, Liu edged closer to González, then after getting a shoulder ahead, quickly expanded the lead.  With six officials watching over the last 100 metres, Liu did not pick up any calls and crossed the finish line first, two seconds up on González, seven on Lu.  Behind them, Qieyang surged back to Palmisano, but could not get past.

Records
The existing World and Olympic records stood as follows.

Schedule
All times are Brasília Time (UTC–3)

Results
Warnings (Athletes with 3 warnings are automatically disqualified)
 ~ - Loss of Contact
 > - Bent knee

References

Women's 20 kilometres walk
Racewalking at the Olympics
2016 in women's athletics
Women's events at the 2016 Summer Olympics